Brian Tiler (15 March 1943 – 30 June 1990) was an English footballer. Tiler, a central defender, began his career at his home town club Rotherham United where he made his debut in 1962–63. He spent seven seasons at Millmoor, playing more than two hundred league games, before moving on to Aston Villa in December 1968.

At Aston Villa, Tiler had the misfortune of being a member of the side that were relegated to the Third Division for the first and only time in the club's history in 1969–70. However, he was also a member of the Villa side that won promotion two years later. In October 1972, he was transferred to Carlisle United, where he finished his Football League career.

In 1974, he was appointed player manager of non league Wigan Athletic, where he spent two years, and won the Northern Premier League in 1974–75. He played eleven league games for Wigan before leaving the club in 1976. He would later return to Springfield Park as the coach of the Zambia national team, who Wigan played a friendly against in October 1978.

He then moved to America to join the Portland Timbers, originally as a player before joining the coaching staff.
In 1980, he became assistant manager to Ron Newman at the Miami Americans in the franchise's only year of existence. After nine games, Newman quit to take over as coach at the San Diego Sockers, and Brian Tiler stepped up to become Head Coach until the team's demise at the end of the season.

Tiler later became managing director at AFC Bournemouth, where he helped engineer Bournemouth's first ever promotion to the Second Division in 1986–87 along with his friend, team manager Harry Redknapp. In June 1990, Tiler was killed in a car accident in Italy, when a car collided head on with the minibus in which Tiler and Redknapp were travelling.

Redknapp was also badly injured in the accident, but survived and went on to make a full recovery. The pair were in Italy watching that summer's World Cup.

References

External links
 NASL stats

1943 births
1990 deaths
American Soccer League (1933–1983) coaches
English footballers
English expatriate footballers
English football managers
Rotherham United F.C. players
Aston Villa F.C. players
Carlisle United F.C. players
North American Soccer League (1968–1984) players
Portland Timbers (1975–1982) players
Wigan Athletic F.C. players
Wigan Athletic F.C. managers
Road incident deaths in Italy
Portland Timbers (NASL) coaches
North American Soccer League (1968–1984) coaches
American soccer coaches
1978 African Cup of Nations managers
Association football central defenders
English expatriate sportspeople in the United States
Expatriate soccer players in the United States